The woodworker frog (Limnodynastes lignarius) is a species of frog in the family Limnodynastidae. It is endemic to Australia. Its natural habitats are subtropical or tropical dry shrubland, subtropical or tropical dry lowland grassland, rivers, intermittent rivers, rocky areas, and caves.

References

Limnodynastes
Amphibians of Western Australia
Amphibians of the Northern Territory
Amphibians described in 1979
Taxonomy articles created by Polbot
Frogs of Australia